Daughters of Today may refer to:
 Daughters of Today (1928 film), a Pakistani silent film
 Daughters of Today (1924 film), an American silent drama film